Badlu Singh  VC (13 January 187623 September 1918) was an Indian recipient of the Victoria Cross, the highest and most prestigious award for gallantry in the face of the enemy that can be awarded to British and Commonwealth forces.

He was born in village Dhakla, district Rohtak (now Jhajjar), Haryana, India. His father was Lal Singh.

VC Badlu Singh  was born in the village Dhakla of Rohtak now Jhajjar District, Haryana. After which he joined the British Army. He was a Risaldar in 14th Murray's Jat Lancers, British Indian Army, attached to 29th Lancers (Deccan Horse), during the First World War when he performed the deed on 23 September 1918 at Khes Samariveh, Jordan River, Palestine for which he was posthumously awarded the VC.

The citation reads:

He is commemorated on the Heliopolis (Port Tewfik) Memorial in the Heliopolis War Cemetery, Cairo, Egypt. The VC medal is currently in Red Fort Museum, his family gave up the medal to the Government. Today the descendants of VC Badlu Singh reside in Dhakla, Haryana.

References

External links
Badlu Singh
Burial location of Badlu Singh "Egypt"

1918 deaths
Indian World War I recipients of the Victoria Cross
British Indian Army officers
Indian Army personnel killed in World War I
1876 births
Burials at Heliopolis War Cemetery
People from Jhajjar district
Military personnel of British India